The 1994 French Grand Prix was a Formula One motor race held on 3 July 1994 at the Circuit de Nevers Magny-Cours near Magny-Cours in France. It was the seventh race of the 1994 Formula One World Championship.

The 72-lap race was won by Michael Schumacher, driving a Benetton-Ford. It was Schumacher's sixth victory in seven races. Damon Hill finished second in a Williams-Renault, having started from pole position and led the race, while Gerhard Berger finished third in a Ferrari.

Schumacher now led the Drivers' Championship by 37 points from Hill.

Report

Background
Nigel Mansell made his return to Formula One, driving for Williams-Renault in place of David Coulthard. He had left F1 at the end of 1992 to race in IndyCar. JJ Lehto was rested by Benetton-Ford and was replaced by the test driver Jos Verstappen who had previously deputised for Lehto earlier in the season. Jean-Marc Gounon would drive the second Simtek-Ford following Andrea Montermini's accident at the Spanish Grand Prix.

Race
Olivier Panis and Gianni Morbidelli collided on lap 29. This was the only retirement of the season for Panis. Michael Schumacher won the race ahead of Damon Hill and Gerhard Berger. Heinz-Harald Frentzen finished fourth, his best Formula One finish up to this point. Pierluigi Martini was fifth and Andrea de Cesaris finished sixth. These would prove to be the last world championship points that Martini and de Cesaris scored in their careers, with de Cesaris failing to finish another race in his Formula One career. The ninth place of Jean-Marc Gounon, four laps behind, would be the best result for the Simtek Team, a feat they would only reach once again.

Classification

Qualifying

Race

Championship standings after the race

Drivers' Championship standings

Constructors' Championship standings

References

French Grand Prix
Grand Prix
French Grand Prix
French Grand Prix